KJMA (89.7 MHz) is a non-commercial FM radio station licensed to Floresville, Texas, and serving the southern suburbs of the San Antonio metropolitan area.  It broadcasts a Catholic radio format.

It is affiliated with the Guadalupe Radio Network and is owned by the La Promesa Foundation.  Some of the programming comes from the EWTN Radio Network.

The transmitter is off County Road 239 in Wilson County, Texas.

History
The station was assigned the call sign KWCB on January 17, 1992.  On July 16, 2007, the station changed its call sign to the current KJMA.

Translators

In addition to the main station, KJMA is relayed by a translator station to widen its broadcast area.

References

External links

Radio stations established in 1992
JMA
Catholic radio stations